The UK Singles Chart is a record chart compiled on behalf of the British record industry. Until 1 February 1994, the chart was compiled each week by Gallup – after this date, it was managed by Millward Brown, who expanded the number of sales figures sampled, and extended the use of electronic point of sale machines. From July 1998 onwards, compilation of the chart was overseen by The Chart Information Network (CIN) and it was based entirely on sales of physical singles from retail outlets – airplay statistics are not used in compiling the official UK Singles Chart. The chart week ran from Sunday to Saturday, and the Top 40 was first revealed on BBC Radio 1 on a Sunday. Record companies began making singles available to radio stations much further in advance of their release dates and making greater use of direct marketing techniques in the 1990s.  As a result, the number of singles that entered the charts at number one increased dramatically, and it became commonplace for singles to enter the charts at the top and then plummet down the listing soon after.

During the decade, 206 singles reached the number-one position on the chart.  "Hangin' Tough" by New Kids on the Block reached number one on the first new chart of the decade, replacing "Do They Know It's Christmas?" by Band Aid II which had been number one on the last chart issued in 1989. The longest spell at the top was achieved by Bryan Adams's song "(Everything I Do) I Do It for You", which spent 16 weeks at number one in 1991, beating the record for the longest unbroken run at the top of the charts which had been held by Slim Whitman's "Rose Marie" since 1955. Wet Wet Wet and Whitney Houston also had runs of 10 or more weeks at number one during the 1990s. Although it only spent five weeks at number one, Elton John's 1997 single "Candle in the Wind 1997" / "Something About the Way You Look Tonight" sold almost 5 million copies, becoming the biggest-selling single in UK history. Cher's song "Believe" spent 7 weeks at number-one at the end of 1998 and became the biggest-selling single by a female artist in UK history. Also, Cher is the female solo artist with the most number-one singles in the 1990s (a total of three) and the female solo artist with most weeks at number one (13). The final number one of the decade was the double A-side "I Have a Dream" / "Seasons in the Sun" by Westlife. Take That and the Spice Girls share the distinction of having achieved the most number-one hits in the 1990s, with eight each.

Number-one singles

Artists by total number of weeks at number-one

Songs by total number weeks at number one 
The following songs spent at least six weeks at number one during the 1990s.

By artist
The following artists achieved three or more number one hits during the 1990s. George Michael's collaborations with Elton John and Queen, in which both acts received billing on the single's cover, are counted for both acts.  Appearances on the "Perfect Day" single are not included, as the individuals did not receive individual credit on the cover.

A.  Total does not include an appearance on the "Perfect Day" single.

By record label

The following record labels had five or more number ones on the UK Singles Chart during the 1990s.

Million-selling and platinum records
See also List of Platinum singles in the United Kingdom awarded before 2000 and List of million-selling singles in the United Kingdom

In April 1973, the British Phonographic Industry (BPI) began classifying singles and albums by the number of units sold. In the 1990s the highest threshold was "platinum record" and was awarded to singles that sold over 600,000 units. In February 1987, the BPI introduced multi-platinum awards so if a single sold 1,200,000 units it was classified as 2×platinum, 1,800,000 units as 3×platinum, and so on.

Sixty-six records, including forty-seven number ones, were classified platinum in the 1990s and three other songs released in the 1990s were classified as platinum in the subsequent decade. Thirty records from the decade sold over one million units. Fourteen of these also went multi-platinum and "Candle in the Wind 1997" went nine times platinum and became the best-selling single of all time. "Angels" by Robbie Williams, "Torn" by Natalie Imbruglia, and  "Wonderwall" by Oasis all sold over one million copies but failed to get to number one.

Additional information
[No 2]: The singles "I Swear", "Wonderwall", "Father and Son", "Children", "Un-Break My Heart", "Tubthumping", "Torn", "Ghetto Superstar", "Music Sounds Better with You", "If I Could Turn Back the Hands of Time", and "Better Off Alone" peaked at number two in the UK Singles Chart.
[No 3]: The singles "I'll Be There for You", "Missing", "When You're Gone", "That Don't Impress Me Much", and "No Scrubs" peaked at number three in the UK Singles Chart.
[No 4]: The singles "Together Again", "Truly Madly Deeply", and "Angels" peaked at number four in the UK Singles Chart.
[No 7]: The single "How Do I Live" peaked at number seven in the UK Singles Chart.

Notes

References
General

Specific

External links
Archive of all UK Number One Singles of the 1990s with images of original packaging

1990s
1990s in British music
United Kingdom Singles